Talaat Moustafa Group Holding SAE (TMGH), is one of the largest listed real estate development companies in Egypt. It was founded in 2007 as a holding company of pre-existing companies, some of which were founded in the 1970s by the late Talaat Moustafa, and publicly listed on the Egyptian Exchange that same year. The group is known for the development of large gated communities, as well as a chain of hotels, where it is one of the top ten listed real estate developers in terms of profits, as well as land, holding over 16,000 acres in Greater Cairo, the largest of any developer by far.

Ownership 
As of December 2021, the Talaat Moustafa Group’s largest shareholder at 43% was TMG for Real Estate and Touristic Investments SAE, a company jointly held by the Talaat Moustafa Family (Tarek, Hani and Hisham Talaat Moustafa, 60%) and the Saudi Bin Laden family (40%). With stakes through another company (Alexandria Construction Company SAE) brothers Tarek, Hisham and Hany ultimately own 34% of TMGH’s stock. Hisham Talaat Moustafa has been group CEO since the 2017, and has also served as a member of the Shura Council (Upper House). Brother Tarek Talaat Moustafa is group Chairman since 2008 and a former member of parliament.

The second largest shareholder is the Saudi Bin Laden family, famous for their large construction interests in their home country through the Saudi Binladen Group. In Egypt, brothers Yehia and Omar Bin Laden have various real estate investments, owning 17% of TMGH through their 40% stake in TMG for Real Estate and Touristic Investments SAE. The third largest shareholder is another Saudi family, that of Abdelmoniem Alrashed, owning 7% of the group through the UAE based company, Rimco EGT Investment LLC. The remaining identifiable owners are mostly investment funds, led by the Norges Bank who owned 3.3% of TMGH’s shares in 2021.

Projects

Cities and communities

TMG is behind some of Egypt's largest community developments, including the New Cairo cities of Madinaty, El Rehab,  Celia, and the recently launched, Noor. Other developments include May Fair in El Sherouq City, El Rabwa in Sheikh Zayed City, Virginia Beach in the North Coast of Alexandria, and El Radwa El Khadraa in El Agamy. In all, TMG boasts a population of over 1 million residents across its projects, ranking it the highest in the world for a private developer.

Hotels and resorts

TMG's hospitality endeavors include Four Seasons Nile Plaza, Four Seasons Sharm El Sheikh, Four Seasons San Stefano, and Kempinski Nile Hotel.

The Four Seasons Nile Plaza is widely considered the finest and most secure hotel in Cairo, offering presidential-level security and accommodations to visiting heads of state and top government officials.

Following an announcement in 2017 for the expansion of the Four Seasons Sharm El Sheikh, upon completion, the hotel will be the largest Four Seasons Resort in the world.

In 2016, TMG announced plans to build a Four Seasons hotel in its New Cairo property Madinaty, part of an  development and expansion in New Cairo. Plans to build a Four Seasons hotel in Luxor were made in 2008 but put on hold in the wake of the Egyptian Revolution.

References

External links
 Talaat Moustafa Group web site

1974 establishments in Egypt
Construction and civil engineering companies established in 1974
Conglomerate companies of Egypt
Conglomerate companies established in 1974
Companies listed on the Egyptian Exchange